Saint-Laurent-d'Aigouze (Provençal: Sent Laurenç de Gosa) is a commune in the Gard department in southern France. Saint-Laurent-d'Aigouze station has rail connections to Nîmes and Le Grau-du-Roi.

The commune contains the ruins of Psalmody Abbey, a Benedictine monastery founded in the 5th century.

Population

See also
Communes of the Gard department

References

Communes of Gard